Grays (also called Gray) is an unincorporated community in Stevens County, in the U.S. state of Washington.

History
A post office called Gray was established in 1901, and remained in operation until 1935. The community was named after William Gray, a local land owner.

References

Unincorporated communities in Stevens County, Washington
Unincorporated communities in Washington (state)